The Black River is a  river with headwaters located just south of Owensville, Indiana. It flows southwest through southwestern Gibson County and northwestern Posey County under Interstate 64 between Poseyville and Griffin before emptying into the Wabash River just north of New Harmony.

See also
 List of rivers of Indiana

References

Rivers of Indiana
Rivers of Gibson County, Indiana
Rivers of Posey County, Indiana